Sachiko Murakami (born 1980) is a Canadian poet. She is most noted for her 2008 collection The Invisibility Exhibit, which was a shortlisted finalist for the Governor General's Award for English-language poetry at the 2008 Governor General's Awards and the Gerald Lampert Award.

Murakami was born in Vancouver, British Columbia. Her other works include Rebuild (2011), Get Me Out of Here (2015), and Render (2020). Render was shortlisted for the Governor General's Award for English-language poetry at the 2020 Governor General's Awards.

References

External links
Sachiko Murakami

1980 births
21st-century Canadian poets
Canadian women poets
Canadian people of Japanese descent
Canadian writers of Asian descent
Writers from Vancouver
Living people
21st-century Canadian women writers